Sahelis Productions is a film and television video production and post-production company based in Ouagadougou, Burkina Faso.
The company was founded in 1992 by Sékou Traoré (Director), Issa Traoré de Brahima (Director, Artistic Director) and Dani Kouyaté (Director).

History

The three founders were studying film together in Paris in 1989 when they decided to found the company.
They were assisted in launching Sahelis Production in 1992 by filmmakers Lacina Ouédraogo and Abdoulaye Dao, and by Paris-based Claude Gilaizeau of "Productions de la Lanterne".
Sékou Traoré was manager from 1992 to 2007. Dani Kouyaté and Issa Traore de Brahima co-managed the company from 2007 to 2011. 
Lacina Ouédraogo became manager in March 2011. The company has produced or co-produced six feature films and about fifteen short films.
Sahelis has also made many commercials and twenty documentary films.

Filmography

Fiction feature films

Fiction short films

Documentaries

References

Mass media companies of Burkina Faso